Groß Glienicke  is a village located both in Berlin and Potsdam, the capital of the German state of Brandenburg. Until 2003, when it was merged into Potsdam, the Brandenburg—and main—side, was an autonomous municipality. The Berlin side is part of Kladow in the Spandau district.

Overview
The principal geographic feature is the Groß Glienicker See (lake). The former Saxon Crown Prince Georg, who had renounced his royal heritage to become a Jesuit priest, drowned in the Groß Glienicker See on May 14, 1943, allegedly murdered by the Gestapo. The area is largely forested and surrounded by historic manor houses and former royal estates.

See also
Seeburger Zipfel

References

External links
Potsdam City Website (English)

Geography of Potsdam
Districts of Potsdam
Zones of Berlin
Villages in Brandenburg
Spandau